ẗ is a modified letter of the Latin alphabet, derived from the letter T with a double dot on it. It is used in the ISO 233 transliteration of Arabic to represent tāʼ marbūṭa (ﺓ, ﺔ), and also in the Uralic Phonetic Alphabet to represent a tenuis interdental stop . It is also used in the Ixtlán Zapotec language.

Only the minuscule form exists in Unicode as a distinct character. The majuscule must be formed with a combination of T and a combining diacritic (T̈), and because of this may not display correctly when using some fonts or systems.

See also
Diaeresis (computing)

References

Latin letters with diacritics